Reminisce is an upcoming American drama film directed by Mädchen Amick, and starring Bruce Dern and Elissa Shay. It is Amick's feature directorial debut.

Cast
Bruce Dern as Papa Joe
Elissa Shay as Hayley
Julia Ormond as Dr. Rose
Johnny Ferro
Anzu Lawson
Iqbal Theba
Brandilyn Cheah as Young Haley

Production
Principal photography began in Los Angeles in July 2021.

References

External links
 

Upcoming films
American drama films
Films shot in Los Angeles
2020s English-language films